Sarath Chandrasiri (13 June 1964 – 4 December 2021: as සරත් චන්ද්‍රසිරි) [Sinhala]) was an actor in Sri Lankan cinema, theater and television. He is best known for the role "Samagipura Wasantha" in popular television serial Paba and role "Ukkuwa" in the serial Malee.

Personal life
He was born on 13 June 1964 in Panadura, Ceylon. He went to Wekada Bauddhaloka Vidyalaya where he met drama teacher Sarath Kulanga. Later he was educated at Sri Sumangala Vidyalaya, Panadura.

Chandrasiri is married to longtime partner Charika Jayamali. The couple has one son – Kanchuka Thilakshana, and one daughter – Hasara Nilakshi. Kanchuka is an engineer graduated from University of Moratuwa. Hasara is a physics graduate at University of Sri Jayewardenepura.

On 21 November 2016, Chandrasiri was hospitalized by a brief illness while working in a stage play. He was rushed into the Alpitiya hospital. In November 2021, he was again hospitalized and has been receiving treatment at the Intensive Care Unit of the Colombo National Hospital for the many weeks due to an internal hemorrhage. During that period, false rumors circulated that he died at the hospital. Later on 4 December 2021, he died at the age of 57 while receiving treatment at National Hospital, Colombo due to cerebral hemorrhage. Funeral service was held on 6 December 2021 at 4.00 pm at the Walgama Crematorium in Bandaragama.

Career
Chandrasiri made his acting debut in 1976 on the school stage. In 1979, he won the Best Actor award at the All Island Drama Competition, opened the doors of the stage with the stage play 'Ahas Maliga' produced by veteran songstress Chandrika Siriwardena. Then he started drama career under the guidance of his teacher Sarath Kulanga. Meanwhile, he met several other playwrights including Janak Premalal and Jayalath Manoratne through Kulanga. Under them he acted in many stage plays such as Abuddassa Kolama, Raja Kapuru, Andarela, Thalamala Pipila, Guru Tharuwa and Puthra Samagama.

He made television debut with the serial Sankranthi Samaya directed by Ananda Abenayake. In the preceding years, he joined with many television serials such as: Asani Væsi, Varaperaḷiya, Doo Daruvō, Punchi Vīrayō, Aḍō, Damsārī and Mahaviru Paṇḍu. In 2006, he joined with the regular cast of popular soap opera Paba where he played the popular role of "Samagipura Wasantha". Later he made the many notable roles in the serials including: as "Kuṇu Anṭā" in Depath Nayi, as "Perum Puli" in Wasantha Kusalana, as "Majan" in Ransirigē Sangrāmaya, as "Baṇḍā" as Hiru Soyā, as "Tikiri Baṇḍā" in Guru Tharuva, as "Hanumanthā" in Wesgattō, as "Saraa" in Jodu Gedara and as "Veda Mahaththayā" in Neela Pabaḷu. Meanwhile in 2011, he made the sub lead role "Ukkuwa" in the supernatural drama Malee. After the huge popularity, he reprised the role in second season of the show titled Aththamma. In the third season Sidu he made a cameo role in few early episodes.

In 2000, he made film debut with a minor role of "Purple shirt shooter" in the crime film Rajya Sevaya Pinisai directed by Udayakantha Warnasuriya. Since then he received many villain and thug roles in the films such as; One Shot, Samanala Thatu, Sudu Hansi, Mago Digo Dai and Gamani. Meanwhile, he made the role "Devil" in children's film Ran Kevita. After series of supportive and minor roles in cinema, he made the sub lead role of "Circuit Sarath" in the comedy drama Dr. Nawariyan. His final acting appearance came through the role "Anton, the bus driver" in the television serial Rella Veralata Adarei in 2021.

Selected stage plays

 Abuddassa Kolama
 Andarela
 Chawdari 
 Dennek Na Ekkenai 
 Eka Sakkuwe
 Guru Tharuwa
 Ko Kukko 
 Kolam Pure 
 Mee Harak 
 Nari Burathi 
 Puthra Samagama 
 Raja Kapuru 
 Romba Thanks 
 Sooti Gamarala Saha Raigam Banda 
 Thalamala Pipila

Selected television serials

 Ado 
 Akkaragala 
 Aththamma 
 Chandi Kumarihami 
 Damsaari 
 Doo Daruwo 
 Handapana 
 Jodu Gedara 
 Kethumathi
 Mahaviru Pandu 
 Malee 
 Minigandela 
 Paba
 Ralla Weralata Adarei
 Ran Poruwa 
 Salmal Aramaya 
 Sidu
 Sihina Samagama
 Susuma 
 Wasantha Kusalana

Filmography

Awards

Raigam Tele'es 

|-
|| 2007 ||| Wasantha Kusalana || Best Supporting Actor||

References

External links
 Malee 2 Aththamma unspools from next Monday
 ප්‍රවීණ රංගන ශිල්පී සරත් චන්ද්‍රසිරි මහතාගේ හෘදයාබාධයේ ඇත්ත
 සරත් ඩබලගෙ නෙළන සින්දු
 සරත් චන්ද්‍රසිරි එළවළු වවන්න පටන් අරන්
 වෙඩින් පුඩින්
 මා තුල සිටින ජීවියා මා පාලනය කරගත යුතුයි

1964 births
2021 deaths
Sri Lankan male film actors
Sinhalese actors
20th-century Sri Lankan actors
21st-century Sri Lankan actors
People from Panadura